Miguel Henríquez Guzmán (August 4, 1898 in Torreón, Coahuila – August 29, 1972 in Mexico City) was a Mexican politician and military officer. He challenged the official candidate of the Institutional Revolutionary Party for the presidency in 1952.

Biography 
Henríquez Guzmán rose through the military ranks during the years following the Mexican Revolution. It was in this context that he met General (and later President) Lázaro Cárdenas.

Like other military officers of the time, Henríquez joined the military wing of the Institutional Revolutionary Party or PRI in 1938. Even after the PRI was later reorganized and its military wing was eliminated as one of its basic constituencies, Henríquez Guzmán remained a dedicated party member, despite the popularity achieved by his fellow general Juan Andrew Almazán as an opposition candidate in the 1940 presidential election.

By 1951, however, Miguel Henríquez Guzmán joined with his brother, the noted entrepreneur Jorge Henríquez Guzmán, and other high-ranking members of the PRI such as José Muñoz Cota, to create a break-away party of former PRI activists, which they called the Federation of the Mexican People's Parties. Prominent members in this new party included other former generals from the Mexican Revolution such as Genovevo de la O, as well as other political parties such as the Partido Constitucionalista Mexicano (Mexican Constitutionalist Party) led by General Francisco Múgica. The result was a broad alliance of political, pro-agrarian reform, and social organizations that represented a serious challenge to the practice of presidential succession under the period of PRI domination from 1940 to 1988.

In particular, in the 1952 general election Henríquez Guzmán ran against the candidates of the established parties—the PRI (Adolfo Ruiz Cortines), the PAN (Efraín González Luna), and the Popular Party (Vicente Lombardo Toledano). It was during this campaign season that the model of political advertising aimed at praising the virtues of a party's candidate was adopted. This was the first time in Mexican history when marketing research was used in a political campaign. The Henríquez Guzmán campaign used a Mariachi tune composed for him by Manuel Ramos Trujillo to promote his candidacy. Though this use of campaign jingles was condemned by critics who saw it as taking away the seriousness of the business of politics, the success of the song throughout many regions of the country led to the wide adoption of this and other marketing techniques in future campaigns.

In the final count, Ruiz Cortines won with more than 74 percent of the popular vote, followed by Henríquez Guzmán with 15.9 percent. These results set off a wave of protests in several states, which were violently suppressed by the administration of Miguel Alemán Valdés. Among those calling for justice were the former Mexican ambassador to Honduras, José Muñoz Cota Ibáñez, and Alicia Pérez Salazar. Despite the intensity of the protests, the results stood. Henríquez Guzmán then retired from public life.

Politicians from Coahuila
Institutional Revolutionary Party politicians
Mexican military personnel
1898 births
1972 deaths